Makowo is an administrative ward in Njombe Urban District in the Njombe Region of the Tanzanian Southern Highlands. The ward consists of three villages: Mamongolo, Mkowo and Ng'elamo.

Notes

Wards of Njombe Region